Eugene Fasullo (April 20, 1931 - October 20, 2020) was the Chief Engineer of Port Authority of New York and New Jersey. He graduated with BS from Brooklyn Polytechnic Institute MS from University of Illinois. He was also a professor at NYU Poly.

Fasullo was elected a member of the National Academy of Engineering in 1994 for the design of outstanding structures and leadership in engineering and management in the public sector.

On October 30, 2020, Fasullo died in his sleep. He was 89 years old.

References

Polytechnic Institute of New York University alumni
Polytechnic Institute of New York University faculty